West Ridgley is a locality and small rural community in the local government area of Burnie in the North West region of Tasmania.
The 2016 census determined a population of 125 for the state suburb of West Ridgley.

History
The locality was gazetted in 1966.

Geography
The Guide River forms the eastern boundary, and the Cam River forms the western boundary.

Road infrastructure
The C104 route (West Ridgley Road / Guide Road) enters from the east and runs south-west before exiting to the south. Route C105 (West Ridgley Road / Serpentine Road) starts and finishes at two intersections with route C104, performing a loop that runs west, south and east.

References

Burnie, Tasmania
Towns in Tasmania